Avonlea is a village in the Canadian province of Saskatchewan within the RM of Elmsthorpe No. 100 and Census Division No. 2. The Southern Rails Cooperative maintains its head office in the village.

Along the east side of the village, heading north, is Avonlea Creek. Avonlea Creek is a tributary of the Moose Jaw River and it joins the Moose Jaw River near Rouleau. The reservoir is the village's only water source.

History 
Avonlea incorporated as a village on February 10, 1912. The village was named after the fictional town of Avonlea, Prince Edward Island in Lucy Maud Montgomery's novel Anne of Green Gables. The television series Road to Avonlea is based on the book.

Parks and attractions
Avonlea Heritage Museum houses many artifacts from the area in the train station, and contains an indoor Main Street, agricultural displays as well as murals by accomplished local artist Paul Geraghty.

Avonlea Badlands are four kilometres away to the west on private land. Guided tours are available through the museum.

The picturesque Dirt Hills to the west are home to natural flora and fauna. The Dirt Hills are the largest push moraine in the world.

Dunnet Regional Park, which was named after a local medical doctor, was built and opened on the west side of Reg Watson Reservoir in 1967. The park provides RV parks, camping, fishing, boating, a swimming pool, and eight baseball diamonds. Fish species in the lake include walleye, yellow perch, northern pike, white sucker, and burbot. Walleye are liberally stocked in the lake.

Sports and recreation
Long Creek Golf & Country Club is an 18-hole championship golf course four kilometres east of the village along Avonlea Creek.

Avonlea is home to the Avonlea Arrows of the senior men's Highway Hockey League. The team plays at the village's Avonlea Arena.

Demographics 

See also
List of villages in Saskatchewan
List of communities in Saskatchewan

References

External links

Villages in Saskatchewan
Elmsthorpe No. 100, Saskatchewan
Division No. 2, Saskatchewan